Bengt Mikael Mogren, (born 6 September 1969) is a Swedish bishop, theologian and author.

Biography
Morgen was born in a peasant family in Hammar, Askersund in Örebro. For some time he worked as a prison officer. He has undergone training in antiquarian buildings in Gothenburg and studied theology in Uppsala, Tübingen and at Harvard University. In his master's thesis, he wrote about the youth movement in the Coptic Church. Mogren was ordained a priest in 1996 for the Diocese of Strängnäs by Bishop Jonas Jonson. Mogren worked, between 2004 and 2011, at Holy Trinity Parish in Uppsala. In 2011 he became the diocesan curate in Västerås.

He received his doctorate in church science with the dissertation Den romantiska kyrkan (The romantic church), dealing with his views on church and state in the early 1800s. He addresses the issue of the anti-Semitic ideas present among several romantic thinkers. In 2003, he was named Teacher of the Year by the students of the Faculty of Theology in Uppsala. On May 19, 2015 he was elected bishop of the Diocese of Västerås. He was ordained a bishop in Uppsala Cathedral on September 6, 2015.

References

1969 births
Living people
Swedish Lutheran bishops
LGBT Lutheran bishops
Swedish LGBT people
Harvard Divinity School alumni
People from Askersund Municipality
21st-century Lutheran bishops